Mörsbach is an Ortsgemeinde – a community belonging to a Verbandsgemeinde – in the Westerwaldkreis in Rhineland-Palatinate, Germany.

Geography

Location
The community lies in the Westerwald between Limburg and Siegen in the nature and landscape conservation area of the Kroppach Switzerland (Kroppacher Schweiz). It belongs to the Verbandsgemeinde of Hachenburg, a kind of collective municipality. Its seat is in the like-named town.
Another Mörsbach is Part of the Town Zweibrücken in Rheinland-Pfalz near the Border to Saarland with about 1000 Citizen

Constituent communities
Mörsbach's Ortsteile are Obermörsbach, Niedermörsbach, Wintershof and Burbach.

History
In 1335, Mörsbach had its first documentary mention as Mersbach.
The other Mörsbach near Zweibrücken -->1441 wurde der Ort als Morspach erstmals genannt, lag damals aber noch im Tal des Bundenbachs in der Au. Erst als es nach dem Dreißigjährigen Krieg verödet war und Neusiedler aus dem Berner Oberland angeworben wurden, errichteten diese den Ort auf der Höhe neu. Wegen der Herkunft dieser Siedler, die der landwirtschaftlichen Entwicklung große Impulse gaben, wird Mörsbach in der Umgegend als Die kleine Schweiz bezeichnet.

Mörsbach gehörte bis zu dessen Ende stets zu Pfalz-Zweibrücken. Seit dem 19. Jahrhundert wurde es von der Bürgermeisterei Großbundenbach aus verwaltet, ehe die bis dahin eigenständige Gemeinde am 22. April 1972 nach Zweibrücken eingemeindet wurde[1].

Von der am Bundenbach gelegenen ehemaligen Mörsbacher Mühle wurde jahrzehntelang das Trinkwasser für die drei Ortschaften Mörsbach, Großbundenbach und Kleinbundenbach auf die Höhe gepumpt.

Politics

The municipal council is made up of 9 council members, including the extraofficial mayor (Bürgermeister), who were elected in a majority vote in a municipal election on 13 June 2004.

Economy and infrastructure

South of the community runs Bundesstraße 414, leading from Hohenroth to Hachenburg. The nearest Autobahn interchanges are Siegen, Wilnsdorf and Herborn on the A 45 (Dortmund–Gießen). The nearest InterCityExpress stop is the railway station at Montabaur on the Cologne-Frankfurt high-speed rail line.

References

External links
 Mörsbach in the collective municipality’s Web pages 

Municipalities in Rhineland-Palatinate
Westerwaldkreis